HMS Racer was a 6-gun  built for the Royal Navy in 1818. She was broken up in 1830.

Description
The ship's tonnage was 122 tons burthen. The Nightingale class was armed with two 6-pounder cannon and four 6-pounder carronades. The ships had a crew of 34 officers and ratings.

Construction and career
Racer, the third ship of her name to serve in the Royal Navy, was ordered in 1817, laid down in August 1817 at Pembroke Dockyard, Wales, and launched on 4 April 1818. She was completed on 31 September 1819 at Plymouth Dockyard.

Notes

References

Nightingale-class cutter
1818 ships
Ships built in Pembroke Dock